Leslie Arthur O'Neill (born 4 December 1943) is an English former professional football player and manager.

Playing career
Born in Blyth, O'Neill played as a midfielder and began his career in non-League football with Blyth Spartans.

He turned professional with Newcastle United in 1963 but was unable to establish himself in the first team.

He then made over 100 first team appearances for each of Darlington, Bradford City and Carlisle United. With Carlisle he made it to the top flight of English football in the same team as Chris Balderstone and Bobby Parker.

He next played in Scotland for Dumfries club Queen of the South where he was re-united again with Balderstone. After one season at Palmerston Park O'Neill retired from playing in 1978.

Coaching career
O'Neill was manager of non-League team Workington between 1989 and 1991, and later managed Penrith.

References

External links
 
 Carlisle United F.C. Hall of Fame

1943 births
Living people
English footballers
English football managers
English people of Irish descent
Blyth Spartans A.F.C. players
Newcastle United F.C. players
Darlington F.C. players
Bradford City A.F.C. players
Carlisle United F.C. players
Queen of the South F.C. players
English Football League players
Scottish Football League players
Workington A.F.C. managers
Penrith F.C. managers
Association football midfielders